This is a list of released songs and instrumentals by British electronic duo the Chemical Brothers. There are  singles and  mix album tracks. The duo have done ten studio albums (one of these a soundtrack) between 1995 and 2021. They have also done multiple mix albums, 29 singles, 4 DVDs, multiple remixes, 6 compilation albums and 6 EPs. The list does not include remixes or alternate versions, except in the case of "Hanna's Theme" and the edits of the Electronic Battle Weapon promo singles.

Singles

Mix album tracks

References

Lists of songs recorded by British artists
British music-related lists